Hank Zipzer is a children's television series which stars Nick James in the titular role as a 12-year-old dyslexic schoolboy. The show is based on the series of books by Henry Winkler, who plays the character of Mr. Rock, Hank's music teacher. The first season premiered in January 2014 on CBBC. Unlike the books that took place in America, the series takes place in Britain. The second season began airing on 13 August 2015. Javone Prince made his first appearance as Mr. Joy in series 2, episode 5, "Hank's Hero". The third season began airing on 26 May 2016, which was followed by an 84-minute Christmas television film, Hank Zipzer's Christmas Catastrophe, in December 2016. All three seasons of the Hank Zipzer series stream globally on HBO Max, and in the U.K. on BBC iPlayer. HBO Max began streaming Hank Zipzer's Christmas Catastrophe on December 2, 2022.

Series overview

Episodes

Season 1 (2014) 
Season 1 was produced by Siobhan Bachman and Ali Bryer Carron.

 Nick James, Jayden Jean-Paul Denis, Chloe Wong, Felicity Montagu, Juliet Cowan, and Madeline Holliday appear in all episodes.
 Nick Mohammed is absent for four episodes.
 Jude Foley is absent for two episodes.
 Neil Fitzmaurice is absent for one episode.
 Vincenzo Nicoli and Henry Winkler are absent for three episodes each.

Season 2 (2015)
Season 2 was produced by Jim Poyser.

 Nick James, Juliet Cowan, Neil Fitzmaurice, and Madeline Holliday appear in all episodes.
 Jayden Jean Paul-Denis, Alicia Lai, and Felicity Montagu are all absent for one episode.
 Nick Mohammed is absent for two episodes before leaving the cast in the episode "Head Ache".
 Javone Prince is absent for two episodes after joining the cast in the episode "Hank's Hero".
 Jude Foley is absent for seven episodes.
 Vincenzo Nicoli is absent for four episodes.
 Henry Winkler is absent for three episodes.

Season 3 (2016) 
Season 3 was produced by Richard Grocock.

Jude Foley and Neil Fitzmaurice are both absents for one episode each.
Javone Prince and Henry Winkler are both absents for two episodes each.
Vincenzo Nicoli is absent for three episodes.

Hank Zipzer's Christmas Catastrophe (2016)

References 

Lists of British comedy television series episodes
Lists of British children's television series episodes